Magnoli is a surname. Notable people with the surname include:

Albert Magnoli (born  1954), American film director, screenwriter, and editor
Demétrio Magnoli (born 1958), Brazilian sociologist, writer, and journalist

Surnames of Italian origin